The Chemical Weapons Act 1996 was passed in the UK during the time of a Conservative government under John Major. It was adopted on the 03/04/1996 and came into force in 16/09/1996. This act was made so that the UK could be compliant with the 1993 Convention on the Prohibition of the Development, Production, Stockpiling and Use of Chemical Weapons and their Destruction. Not only that, but it also creates the criminal offence of producing, developing, handling or transferring chemical weapons. This act gives Britain extra territorial jurisdiction in regard to British nationals who are handling such material. This act also applies to Isle of Man, Guernsy and to Jersey. The department of trade and industry acts as a liaison between the UK and the Organisation for the Prohibition of Chemical Weapons. 

The general interpretation of chemical weapons according to this act is as follows:

 "Toxic chemicals and their precursors"
 "Munitions and other devices designed to cause death or harm through the toxic properties of toxic chemicals released by them"
 And finally- "equipment designed for use in connection with munitions and devices falling within paragraph (b)"

Yet there are some exceptions to these rules. For example: the chemical weapons can be used for "peaceful purposes", "purposes related to protection against toxic chemicals", "legitimate military purposes" and "purposes of enforcing the law".

"Legitimate military purposes" are described as being military purposes, which do not cause harm to people, animals or otherwise harm them.

Section 33 of the Chemical Weapon's act requires The secretary of State to prepare a document on the operation of this act and present it to Parliament annually.

References 

Chemical weapons
Law of the United Kingdom
United Kingdom Acts of Parliament 1996